PYTCHAir is the name given to a Boeing 727 located in the Brislington Area of Bristol.

History
The aircraft was originally a Japan Airlines passenger aircraft which first flew in 1968.  In time it was converted into a private jet and was operated by various owners including LarMag Aviation.

In 2020, it was purchased by activist-entrepreneur Johnny Palmer  with the intention of being transported to Bristol to be used as an office.  However, it was unable to move on the date planned due to unsuitable ground conditions.  In February 2021, it was transported by road to Bonville Road, Brislington. 
, the fuselage is used by media company PYTCH as a meeting space and filming location.

The purchase, challenges, movement  and final location  of the fuselage attracted national and local media coverage.

Artwork
In March 2022 the fuselage was covered in street art by Bristol street artsists Harriet Wood, Curtis Hylton and Hasan Kamil.  The art work drew media attention.

References

External links

Individual aircraft
Japan Airlines
Buildings and structures in Bristol